Rosseland Ballklubb is a Norwegian sports club from Bryne, Norway. It has sections for association football and table tennis.

The club was founded in 1979 by people who had previously been involved in Bryne FK and entered the Football Association of Norway in 1980 in 7. divisjon. The team plays in 4. divisjon, the fifth tier of Norwegian football.

References

Football clubs in Norway
Time, Norway
Sport in Rogaland
Association football clubs established in 1979
1979 establishments in Norway